LA-34 is a constituency of Azad Kashmir Legislative Assembly which is currently represented by Riaz Ahmad of Pakistan Tehreek-e-Insaf. It covers the area of Sindh Balochistan and Punjab (except Gujranwala Division and Rawalpindi Division) in Pakistan. Only refugees from Jammu and Ladakh settled in Pakistan are eligible to vote.

Election 2016

elections were held in this constituency on 21 July 2016.

Election 2021 
Further information: Azad Kashmir election 2021 

Riaz Ahmad of Pakistan Tehreek-e-Insaf won the seat by getting 4,320 votes.

Azad Kashmir Legislative Assembly constituencies